Dellinge Watermill is a watermill situated on the Ledreborg estate, in Lejre Municipality, some 30 kilometres west of Copenhagen, Denmark. It was powered by a tributary of Kornerup Å.

History
Dellinge Watermill is mentioned for the first time i 1664. The current watermill was built as a grain mill in circa 1740.

References

External links
 Source

Listed buildings and structures in Lejre Municipality
Watermills in Denmark